Rainer Krieg (born 2 February 1968) is a German football coach and a former player.

References

External links
 

Living people
1968 births
Association football forwards
German footballers
German football managers
Karlsruher SC players
Karlsruher SC II players
KFC Uerdingen 05 players
SC Fortuna Köln players
1. FC Saarbrücken players
Chemnitzer FC players
Bundesliga players
2. Bundesliga players